Alberto "Beto" Dante Naveda (born 24 May 1972 in San Juan, Argentina, is an Argentine former footballer who played as a striker.  He played professionally in Argentina, Israel, Scotland and the United States.

Career
Naveda started his career with Boca Juniors, where he spent during the year 1994, then was in Quilmes Athletic Club in 1995 and 1996. After leaving, he moved to the United States to play for Major League Soccer side New England Revolution, where he spent two seasons. There, he was named the Midnight Riders Man of the Year for New England's inaugural season. Spells in Israel followed, with a year apiece at Maccabi Ironi Ashdod and Hapoel Jerusalem.  Naveda then moved to Scotland and joined Scottish Premier League side Dundee United, where he made thirteen appearances and scored on his debut against Motherwell. After leaving Tannadice and heading back to Israel, Naveda returned to Scottish football to play for United's neighbours, Dundee, but made only two appearances.  Naveda's final club was Italian side U.S. Sanremese Calcio for 2002–03 before retiring.

References

External links
 
 Beto Naveda – Argentine Primera statistics at Fútbol XXI 
 Beto Naveda at BDFA.com.ar 

1972 births
Living people
Argentine expatriate footballers
Argentine footballers
Boca Juniors footballers
Dundee United F.C. players
Dundee F.C. players
Expatriate footballers in Israel
Expatriate footballers in Scotland
Expatriate footballers in Italy
Expatriate soccer players in the United States
Maccabi Ironi Ashdod F.C. players
Hapoel Jerusalem F.C. players
Argentine expatriate sportspeople in Israel
New England Revolution players
Quilmes Atlético Club footballers
Scottish Premier League players
Argentine Primera División players
Israeli Premier League players
Major League Soccer players
S.S.D. Sanremese Calcio players
Argentine expatriate sportspeople in Italy
Argentine expatriate sportspeople in Scotland
Argentine expatriate sportspeople in the United States
New England Revolution draft picks
Association football forwards
People from San Juan, Argentina
Sportspeople from San Juan Province, Argentina